White Oak is an unincorporated community and census-designated place (CDP) in Craig County, Oklahoma, United States, along State Highway 66, approximately one mile (1.6 km) west of that road's eastern terminus with U.S. Route 60. The community had a post office from October 14, 1898 until October 31, 1957. As of the 2010 census, the White Oak CDP had a population of 263. White Oak's high school closed after the 2010-11 school year due to budget concerns, the elementary school and middle school continue to operate while the old high school building is abandoned. The high school campus contains two basketball gyms, the main gym named Carl Horner gymnasium, and an old gym connected to the school. The only remnants of the football field is the concession stand. 

White Oak is the location of the Shawnee Tribe's annual Spring and Fall Bread Dances and Green Corn ceremonies.

Demographics

References

Shirk, George H. Oklahoma Place Names. Norman, Oklahoma: University of Oklahoma Press, 1987.  .

Unincorporated communities in Craig County, Oklahoma
Census-designated places in Craig County, Oklahoma
Census-designated places in Oklahoma
Unincorporated communities in Oklahoma